The European Data Protection Board (EDPB) is a European Union independent body with juridical personality whose purpose is to ensure consistent application of the General Data Protection Regulation (GDPR) and to promote cooperation among the EU’s data protection authorities. On 25 May 2018, the EDPB replaced the Article 29 Working Party.

Tasks 
The EDPB remit includes issuing guidelines and recommendations, identifying best practices related to the interpretation and application of the GDPR, advising the European Commission on matters related to the protection of personal data in the European Economic Area (EEA), and adopting opinions to ensure the consistency of application of the GDPR by the national supervisory authorities, in particular on decisions having cross-border effects. Additionally, the EDPB is tasked with acting as a dispute resolution body in case of dispute between the national authorities cooperating on enforcement in the context of cross-border cases, encouraging the development of codes of conduct and establishing certification mechanisms in the field of data protection, and promoting cooperation and effective exchange of information and good practices among national supervisory authorities.

Chairmanship 

The European Data Protection Board is represented by its Chair who is elected from the members of the Board by simple majority for a five-year term, renewable once. The same election procedure and term of office apply to the two deputy chairs.

Currently, the Chairmanship of the Board is held by:
Andrea Jelinek, Chair,
Ventsislav Karadjov, Deputy Chair
Aleid Wolfsen, Deputy Chair

EDPB Members 

The Board is composed of representatives of the 27 EU and 3 EEA EFTA national data protection authorities and the European Data Protection Supervisor (EDPS).

External links 

 EDPB official website
 European Commission website on the EDPB
European Union official website, EDPB

References 

European Union law
Information privacy